Rupa & Company Limited is an Indian clothing company which makes knitted garments. The Company is primarily engaged in manufacture of hosiery products in knitted undergarments casual wears and thermal wears. It produces innerwear, casual wear, thermal wear and sleepwear for men, women, and kids. While Frontline is its flagship brand, Rupa family also consists of brands like Softline, Euro, Bumchums, Torrido, Thermocot, Macroman, Footline, and Jon. Rupa is founded and established by brothers PR Agarwala, GP Agarwala and KB Agarwala in 1968 when the erstwhile hosiery market was at a nascent stage and mainly addressed by unorganized players.

Products
Rupa produces vests, briefs, drawers, Bermuda shorts, Capris, T-shirts, lounge wear, boxer shorts and sleepwear for men; and bras, panties, camisoles and leggings for women. It also manufactures baba suits, bloomers and slips for infants/toddlers, and lounge-wear, Bermuda shorts and T-shirts for kids. Thermal wear is another major category that Rupa caters to: It offers winter wear for both men and women.

In popular culture
In Laal Singh Chaddha, a 2022 Bollywood remake of Forrest Gump, the titular character (played by Aamir Khan) is the founder of Rupa, named after Chaddha's love interest.

See also
 Lux Industries

References

External links 

Indian companies established in 1985
Clothing companies of India
Indian brands
Companies based in Kolkata
Companies listed on the National Stock Exchange of India
Companies listed on the Bombay Stock Exchange